is a Japanese manga series written and illustrated by Peach-Pit. It was serialized in Monthly Comic Birz between the September 2002 and July 2007 issues. The individual chapters were collected and released into eight tankōbon volumes by Gentosha. The eight volumes were localized to North America by Tokyopop between March 2003 and June 2007. The story follows Jun Sakurada, a middle school student who withdrew from society after suffering persecutions from his classmates. Following his withdrawal, he is chosen to become the master to a Rozen Maiden named Shinku. Rozen Maidens are seven sentient porcelain dolls who compete against each other to become a perfect doll dubbed as Alice.

Rozen Maiden received a sequel under the series' katakana title. It was serialized in Shueisha's Weekly Young Jump between April 2008 and January 2014. Rozen Maiden has spun off anthology manga and novel stories, art books, and four anime series; the four anime series are titled Rozen Maiden, Rozen Maiden: Träumend, Rozen Maiden: Ouvertüre, and Rozen Maiden: Zurückspulen. Tokyo Broadcasting System were the producers for the anime with Nomad as the animation studio for the first three series and Studio Deen for Zurückspulen. The anime adaptions resulted in several audio disc releases and three video games.

In 2007, Geneon Entertainment USA licensed the first two anime series for North American release and had later signed Funimation on as a distributor, after shutting down in September 2007. In 2011, Sentai Filmworks acquired both seasons as well as the third series; they made the three series available for streaming on Anime Network. Crunchyroll later acquired streaming rights to the first two series. For the fourth series, Sentai Filmworks had acquired the license for digital and home video release, while Crunchyroll acquired streaming rights.

Tokyopop's volumes of Rozen Maiden have appeared on ICv2's monthly top one-hundred selling graphic novels. Reviews towards the manga were generally positive with reviewers praising balance in drama and comedy. For the anime, reception towards the first series was mixed while Träumend was mostly negative.

Plot
In the 20th century, a legendary doll maker named Rozen created seven bisque dolls which were powered and given sentience with a gem called Rosa Mystica. Since then, Rozen sent the dolls away to find masters and to battle among themselves to gather each other's Rosa Mysticas; this competition is referred to as the Alice Game. When a doll obtains all seven, they are to become a perfect doll dubbed as Alice and will be reunited with Rozen. By order of creation, the seven Rozen Maidens are named Suigintou, Kanaria, Suiseiseki, Souseiseki, Shinku, Hinaichigo, and Kirakisho.

Rozen Maiden follows Jun Sakurada, a middle school student who has withdrawn from society after suffering persecutions from his classmates. He is chosen to become Shinku's master and joins the Alice Game along with the other dolls masters. As the series progresses, Jun also becomes the master to Hinaichigo and Suiseiseki. After Souseiseki's Rosa Mystica is taken by Suigintou, Jun's Rozen Maidens resolve to revive her and to end the Alice Game peacefully; they later befriend Kanaria who shares their sentiments. However, the group is attacked by Kirakisho who absorbs Hinaichigo and traps Shinku and Suiseiseki in the N-field, a plane of consciousness which connects the universe. Rozen Maiden concludes with Jun preparing to enter the N-field to save the dolls.

Rozen Maidens plot is continued in the sequel serialization which uses the katakana title of the series. Inside the N-field, Jun is forced into hiding by Kirakisho and contacts an adult version of himself from an alternate world. The adult Jun is able to free Shinku and unite the Rozen Maidens to defeat Kirakisho. Kirakisho returns and successfully captures all the Rozen Maidens' masters. The Rozen Maidens pursue her eventually resulting in most of their defeat except Shinku and Kirakisho. Shinku's sympathy towards Kirakisho's loneliness convinces the latter to surrender her Rosa Mystica. With all seven gathered, Shinku becomes Alice. Using her new powers, Shinku revives her sisters and is put into a coma in return.

Characters

Masters

A middle school student who withdrew from society after he was outed and bullied by his school peers for being a dress designer. Since then, he becomes irritated whenever something related to school is brought up and sinks into a depression when pressured on the topic. His interactions with the Rozen Maidens and their masters changes his outlook on life and he works up the courage to return to society as well as school. He has an older sister named , a high school student who serves as his caretaker while both of their parents work overseas.
In an alternate world without Rozen Maidens, Jun eventually returns to society and is a friendless university student who works at a bookstore. His interactions with Shinku gives him the opportunity to befriend his co-worker, which leads him to join a theatrics club. At the end of the series, he becomes Kirakisho's master.

A sickly girl with a cynical personality. Megu sees Suigintou as an angel of death who will end her suffering. She practically lives in a hospital room due to a congenital heart condition that she's had since birth and is often under constant care and supervision from doctors and nurses.

A doll clothing designer. Mitsu greatly adores the Rozen Maidens which scares the dolls.

A rich man who is haunted by his twin brother's death. Kazuha disproved of his brother's marriage forcing the latter elope and drown in a ferry accident; as such, he intends to use Souseiseki to make his brother's widow suffer. After Souseiseki reveals Kazuha's hatred comes from grief she uses her abilities to leave him at peace.

Souseiseki's master in the anime by Nomad, who substitutes her for his dead son though he overcomes his grief afterwards.

One of Jun's classmates who delivers his school work during his withdrawal. When Hinaichigo's naivety endangers Tomoe's life, Shinku defeats Hinaichigo in the Alice Game and has her become a servant instead of taking her Rosa Mystica. She's highly skilled at kendo which has learned from her father as a young child, and is a member of her school's kendo club to which she is often seen caring around her sword in a duffle bag around her shoulder.

Rozen Maidens 

A legendary doll maker named  wanted to create a perfect doll dubbed as Alice. His attempts resulted in seven sentient bisque dolls which became known as Rozen Maidens. The dolls' sentient nature are powered by a magical gem called Rosa Mystica. To become Alice, a Rozen Maiden must gather all seven Rosa Mysticas; this contest is referred to as the Alice Game. Each Rozen Maiden has a production order, their own personal suitcase, and are accompanied by an artificial spirit which serves the doll. Rozen Maidens rely on a contract with a human master to supply themselves with power for battle. Since then, Rozen has forgone a physical body and lives within the N-field, waiting for Alice.

The first Rozen Maiden and is accompanied by the artificial spirit . She is Gothic-themed and the most ambitious of her sisters and wishes to become Alice to earn Rozen's love. Suigintou possesses black wings which she uses for mobility and offensive purposes. Her master is Megu.

The second Rozen Maiden and is accompanied by the artificial spirit . She was initially a loyal participant of the Alice game but is convinced for a peaceful lifestyle instead. For battle, she plays her violin and manipulates the sound waves to cause destruction. Her master is Mitsu.

The third Rozen Maiden and is accompanied by the artificial spirit . She is a tsundere; she openly insults others but does care about them. Suiseiseki speaks with the copula desu and always speaks in third person. She has no intention of participating in the Alice Game and only wishes to live happily with her twin sister, Souseiseki. Suiseiseki's ability is to supply nourishment to souls and memories and is able to summon plants for offensive purposes with her watering can. Jun becomes her master during the events of the series.

The fourth Rozen Maiden and is accompanied by the artificial spirit . She speaks in as masculine manner and has a strong sense of duty towards her master and role as a Rozen Maiden. Souseiseki's ability is to cut souls and memories with her scissors. Her master is Kazuha in the manga and Motoharu in the anime. During the series, Souseiseki's Rosa Mystica is taken by Suigintou and her body by Kirakisho. Souseiseki is later, revived and becomes Jun's Rozen Maiden. Afterwards, Souseiseki willingly gives Suigintou her Rosa Mystica.

The fifth Rozen Maiden and is accompanied by the artificial spirit . She has a southern belle personality and treats Jun as her servant. Shinku treats regular dolls as if they are alive, and is an avid fan of the fictional puppet show . Shinku wishes to complete the Alice Game without killing her siblings. For battles, she is able to create and control rose petals.

The sixth Rozen Maiden and is accompanied by the artificial spirit . She has a childlike personality and dislikes being alone. For battle, Hinaichigo is able to summon and control strawberry vines. Her master was Tomoe. During the series, Hinaichigo is absorbed by Kirakisho and gives her Rosa Mystica to Shinku.

The seventh and final Rozen Maiden. She was created without a physical body as Rozen tested whether physical limitations prevented him from creating Alice. Her ability allows her to materialize illusions. Because she can not exist outside the N-Field, her main goal is to capture the Rozen Maiden's masters to ease her loneliness. After her defeat, Kirakisho uses her illusions to create a middle school student named  to replace Rozen and to craft imitated Rozen Maidens to be her sister. Following her second defeat, Kirakisho is touched by Shinku's love and surrenders her Rosa Mystica. She was later revived with a physical body and is in possession of the adult Jun.

Other characters

Jun's older sister who has given up a lot of school activities to care for him while their parents are working overseas. She's a student at a nearby high school and is on her school's lacrosse team.

A humanoid with a rabbit's head who dwells in the N-field. He is the referee to the Alice Game, possibly omniscient, and often assists the protagonists through riddles or as a directional guide.

 and 

Bara-Suishou and Enju are characters who appear in the Rozen Maiden: Träumend anime and audio drama. Enju is Rozen's apprentice and the creator of Bara-Suishou, an imitation of a Rozen Maiden. Enju plots a battle between Bara-Suishou and the Rozen Maidens in order to prove his superiority over Rozen. Once Bara-Suishou gathered six Rosa Mysticas, her body overloads, killing her and Enju.

Original work

Rozen Maiden is authored by Peach-Pit and was serialized in Gentosha's Monthly Comic Birz between issues September 2002 and July 2007. Gentosha compiled the individual chapters into eight tankōbon volumes released between March 2003 and June 2007. These volumes were later recompiled into seven shinsōban volumes by Shueisha and released between April 2008 and November 2008. Tokyopop localized Gentosha's tankōbon volumes in English for North America and released them between May 2006 and May 2008. In 2011, Tokyopop's North American division was closed down and their licenses to manga franchises were revoked. Tokyopop's translations were distributed in Australasia by Madman Entertainment. The series has also been localized in other languages such as Chinese, French, and Italian.

In March 2008, Peach-Pit published a one-shot titled  in the 16th issue of Weekly Young Jump. In the following issue, a serialization for Rozen Maiden was announced. Serialization began in Weekly Young Jumps 20th issue in April 2008 until its conclusion in the issue 8 in January 2014. The second series was published under the katakana for Rozen Maiden, and is a sequel to the first series. The series has been localized in other languages such as Italian, French, and Chinese. Peach-Pit also published a one-shot in the October 2013 issue of Ribon which focuses on the Rozen Maidens' past.

Media adaptations

Anime

Rozen Maiden was adapted into an anime, produced by Tokyo Broadcasting System and animated by Nomad. It premiered on Tokyo Broadcasting System and was broadcast between October 7, 2004, and December 23, 2004. It was also broadcast on RKB Mainichi Broadcasting, Mainichi Broadcasting System, BS-i, and Kids Station. Pony Canyon released the series in six DVDs and a box set. Geneon USA localized the series for North America and released it on three DVD volumes. In 2008, Funimation gained distribution rights from Geneon and released a box collection of the series. Sentai Filmworks licensed the series in 2011 and included it in the Rozen Maiden: The Complete Collection DVD box release. Sentai also made the series available for streaming on networks such as Anime Network and Crunchyroll. MVM Films distributed the series in the United Kingdom.

The second series, was first announced in March 2005 and is a continuation of the previous series. It premiered on Tokyo Broadcasting System and was broadcast between October 20, 2005, and January 26, 2006. It was also broadcast on Mainichi Broadcasting System, Chubu-Nippon Broadcasting, BS-i, and Kids Station. Pony Canyon released the series in six DVDs and a box set. As for the first series, Geneon USA localized the series for North America and released the first volume before closing all DVD distribution in September 2007. Following Funimation acquiring the distribution rights, Funimation released the series in three DVD volumes and later, released a box set for the series. Funimation later released a box set which included the first series and Träumend on May 4, 2010. Sentai Filmworks later licensed the series in 2011 and included it in the Rozen Maiden: The Complete Collection DVD box release. Sentai made the series available for streaming on networks such as Anime Network and Crunchyroll. MVM Films distributed the series in the United Kingdom.

It premiered on Tokyo Broadcasting System and was broadcast on December 22 and 23, 2006. The episodes were released on DVD on February 21, 2007. Sentai Filmworks licensed the series in 2011 and included it in the Rozen Maiden: The Complete Collection DVD box release and as a stand-alone DVD. Sentai made the series available for streaming on Anime Network. MVM Films distributed the series in the United Kingdom.

The fourth series is Rozen Maiden: Zurückspulen, referred only as Rozen Maiden in Japan, was announced in November 2012 in Weekly Young Jump. It is an adaption of the second manga series. Unlike the previous three anime series, it is animated by Studio Deen. It premiered on Tokyo Broadcasting System and was broadcast between July 4, 2013, and September 26, 2013. It was also broadcast on Mainichi Broadcasting System, Chubu-Nippon Broadcasting, and BS-TBS. Crunchyroll licensed the series for simulcast followed by Sentai Filmworks who made it available for simulcast on Anime Network and released the series on home video in October 2014.

Discography

The four anime series resulted in several theme music, radio dramas, soundtracks, and two radio programs. It is hosted by Miyuki Sawashiro and Asami Sanada, the voice of Shinku and Jun respectively. Due to positive reception, it was continued through additional CD releases. The soundtracks from the Rozen Maiden video games have also been released. Prior to the anime's creation, a radio drama was produced by Frontier Works who used their own voice cast.

Video games
Three video games have been produced for the series.  is a PlayStation 2 video game developed by Taito and released on April 27, 2006. Its soundtrack, Rozen Maiden Beilege Disk, was included with the game's preorder. The game re-released under the label "Taito Best" on March 25, 2007. Taito released a second game for the PlayStation 2 titled  on March 22, 2007. Its soundtrack, Rozen Maiden Beilege Disk 2, was included with the preorder.

Anthology manga and novels
Several manga spin-offs were created. An anthology tankōbon entitled  was published by Getonsha in 2005. Two anthology series were created based on the second series. The first is Rozen Maiden Dolls Talk by Haru Karuki. It was serialized in Ribon between the January 2012 to April 2014 issues. It began serialization in Miracle Jump issue 12, which was released on December 27, 2012.

Two anthology novel series have been written. Chabō Higurashi wrote the anthology novel series  which consisted of two novels subtitled  and Kalkgrün Augen.

Other
The Rozen Maiden anime has been adapted into three film comic volumes by Gentosha. Two fan books based on the anime were also published:  covers the anime Rozen Maiden and is published by Impress Group;  covers Rozen Maiden: Träumend and is published by Gentosha;  covers Rozen Maiden: Zurückspulen and is published by Shueisha.

Many merchandise has been released based on the Rozen Maiden franchise such as dolls, clothing and accessories, and other miscellaneous items.

Reception
Tokyopop's localized volumes appeared on ICv2's monthly top one-hundred selling graphic novels. The Rozen Maiden manga has received generally positive reviews. Anime News Network praised Peach-Pit's works as always being able to evoke excitement or laughter from its readers but was critical about Rozen Maidens lack of plot and criticized how the dialogue or layout can be vague. Comic Book Bin wrote that while Rozen Maiden was not a splendid manga, its emphasis on psychology and emotion was something American comics should follow to expand their readership. Active Anime praised several aspects of the series: the combination of mystery, comedy, and cuteness with a balance of fantasy and drama; the visual aesthetics of the images and characters; and a broadness that extends towards teens and adults. Initially, Anime Land praised the balance between comedic daily life and the underlying dark side of the plot. In later volumes though, Anime Land criticized the story's pacing and the abrupt ending. In their review of the sequel, Anime Land wrote they were surprised by the dark tone and how the plot was confusing even with knowledge from the first series. Manga-News also praised the story's alteration between moments of peace and conflict but panned the latter volumes for being rushed and losing the story's complexity. In their review of the sequel, Manga-News praised the introduction for being interesting and accessible to new readers.

In 2005, Japanese television network TV Asahi conducted a "Top 100" online web poll and the Rozen Maiden anime adaptation placed 50th. In the subsequent year, Rozen Maiden: Träumend ranked 7th in a "Top 20" poll conducted by Japanese anime magazine Animage. Active Anime had several reviewers for the anime series Rozen Maiden and its sequel Rozen Maiden: Träumend. Christopher Seaman wrote several praises for the anime: the high quality visuals and the detail in the dolls' designs; the soundtrack which complements the visuals; and the story which he considered to be engaging, fast-paced, and comedic. Sandra Scholes described the series as a lavish production and that while it is battle oriented during fight scenes, it also offers emotional moments that cater to girls. Davey C. Jones commented the series is something Chobits fans would enjoy and that Rozen Maiden: Träumends ending is not a "feel good" ending. Rachel Bentham however, was critical of the plot. Bentham described Jun's antisocial personality and friendship with the dolls to be disturbing and criticized the "there can be only one" competition between the dolls calling it misogynistic in nature.

Mania initially expressed skepticism of the show's combination of Gothic Lolita, dolls, magic, and comedy but later calls it a successful experiment and praised the character interactions and the dolls' designs. In their Rozen Maiden: Träumend review, Mania praised the visuals and characters but criticized the unbalanced comic and dark comments and described the revelations and finale as rushed. Anime News Network's review of Rozen Maiden: Träumend were mostly negative and addressed several points: the failed attempts at serious drama which were considered cliché and resulted in cheesy and melodramatic dialogue; the recycled background music; and the ending which was described as inconclusive and slapdash.

Anime News Network's reviews of Rozen Maiden: Zurückspulen was generally positive. Carl Kimlinger described the characterization of the adult Jun as a "highly believable mixture of bruised pride, desperate loneliness, and downtrodden numbness" and praised how relatable the character is compared to his younger self. He also praised the scripting for Jun's life and the scene where Jun's personality is being dissected by his boss to be intelligently written. Bamboo Dong praised Zurückspulens introduction for revitalizing the series. Both reviewers praised the art and dolls' designs and expressed concerns about the confusing plot.

Notes

  Prologue 1 & 2 are the first two chapters from the Rozen Maiden manga. Afterwards, chapters are referred to as Phases starting with Phase 1.
  Tales are what chapters from the sequel manga series are referred as. The sequel is published under the katakana for Rozen Maiden.
KK denotes Rozen Maiden as being written in katakana instead of the English alphabet.

Japanese

References

External links
Manga
 

Anime
 Tokyo Broadcasting System anime official websites:
 Part1
 Träumend
 Ouvertüre
 Zurückspulen

 
2004 anime television series debuts
2005 anime television series debuts
2006 anime television series debuts
2013 anime television series debuts
Dark fantasy anime and manga
Dolls in fiction
Fictional dolls and dummies
Geneon USA
Gentosha manga
Magical girl anime and manga
Nomad (company)
Peach-Pit
Seinen manga
Sentai Filmworks
Sentient toys in fiction
Shueisha franchises
Shueisha manga
Studio Deen
Supernatural anime and manga
TBS Television (Japan) original programming
Tokyopop titles